Cédric Roussel (born 10 October 1972) is a French politician representing La République En Marche! He was the deputy for Alpes-Maritimes's 3rd constituency in the French National Assembly from 21 June 2017 to 21 June 2022..

In parliament, Roussel serves as member of the Committee on Cultural Affairs and Education. In addition to his committee assignments, he is part of the parliamentary friendship groups with Italy, South Korea and Russia.

See also
 2017 French legislative election

References

1972 births
Living people
Deputies of the 15th National Assembly of the French Fifth Republic
La République En Marche! politicians
Politicians from Brest, France